Chaetodiadema pallidum is a species of sea urchins of the Family Diadematidae. Their armour is covered with spines. Chaetodiadema pallidum was first scientifically described in 1907 by Alexander Emanuel Agassiz and Hubert Lyman Clark.

See also 

 Chaetodiadema japonicum
 Chaetodiadema keiense
 Chaetodiadema tuberculatum

References 

Animals described in 1907
Diadematidae